The superficial anterior cervical lymph nodes are found in proximity to the anterior jugular vein.

Lymphatics of the head and neck